The Irish League in season 1914–15 comprised 8 teams, and Belfast Celtic F.C. won the championship.

League standings

Results

References
Northern Ireland - List of final tables (RSSSF)

1914-15
Irish
Irish